Rača may refer to:

Bosnia and Herzegovina 
 Rača, Vlasenica, a village near Vlasenica

Croatia 
 Nova Rača

North Macedonia 
 Rača, Ohrid

Serbia 
 Rača, Serbia, a town and municipality in Šumadija District
 Rača (Bajina Bašta), a village in Zlatibor District
 Rača (Kuršumlija), a village in Toplica District
 Rača (Priboj), a village in Zlatibor District
 Rača monastery, near Bajina Bašta
 Sremska Rača, in Sremska Mitrovica
 Rača Bridge, on the border with Bosnia and Herzegovina
 Rača (Velika Morava), a river in Serbia

Slovakia 
 Rača, Bratislava

Slovenia 
 Rača, Domžale
 Rača (Kamnik Bistrica), a river in Slovenia

See also 
 Raca (disambiguation)